Prompt may refer to:

Computing
 Command prompt, characters indicating the computer is ready to accept input
 Command Prompt, also known as cmd.exe or cmd, the command-line interpreter in some operating systems
 Prompt (natural language), instructions issued to a computer system (such as a text-to-image artificial intelligence) in the form of written or spoken language.
 Prompt engineering, a concept in artificial intelligence in which the description of the task is embedded in the input, e.g., as a question, instead of it being implicitly given.

Other uses
 Prompter (theatre), sometimes prompt, one who prompts an actor if they forget their line
 PROMPT Telescopes (Panchromatic Robotic Optical Monitoring and Polarimetry Telescopes), Chile
 Prompt , a source of nitrogen oxides

See also

 Prompt neutron, in nuclear engineering
Prompt criticality

de:Prompt